Kyeamba is a farming community in the central east part of the Riverina and situated about  north west of Humula and  south west of Tarcutta. At the 2016 census, Kyeamba had a population of 54.

Location and features

The town's name is derived from an aboriginal word for "forehead band".

Kyeamba is situated in the vicinity of the Alfredtown to Kyeamba Road where it meets the Hume Highway. There are no stores or significant public buildings in the area.

Kyamba Telegraph Office opened on 1 September 1861. This later became a post office, was renamed Kyeamba in 1917 and closed in 1957.

Climate 
Due to being on the boundary between the slopes of the Great Dividing Range and Riverina plain, there is a large seasonal range between maximum temperatures and a pronounced winter rainfall peak.

See also

 Burkes Creek

References

Towns in the Riverina
Towns in New South Wales
1861 establishments in Australia
Hume Highway